A referendum on becoming a republic was held in Greece on 13 April 1924. It followed the catastrophic outcome of the Asia Minor Campaign. As a result of the military defeat, King Constantine I was forced to abdicate (27 September 1922) in favor of his son, King George II. King George himself later went into exile in the Kingdom of Romania, the home of his wife Elisabeth of Romania, while the government debated the fate of the monarchy. Ultimately, a plebiscite was called. This referendum, following the restoration of Constantine I in 1920, reflected the see-saw nature of the Greek electorate and the then-present dominance of the Liberal and Republican Venizelists in Greek politics and abolished the Crown.

In the lead up to the referendum, Prime Minister Alexandros Papanastasiou favoured the vote for the Republic, while Venizelos kept a neutral stance. Nonetheless, on 25 March 1924 the Second Hellenic Republic was proclaimed by parliament.

Results

References

1924 referendums
Plebiscite
1920s in Greek politics
Referendums in Greece
Second Hellenic Republic
Republicanism in Greece
History of Greece (1909–1924)
Monarchism in Greece
Constitutional referendums
Monarchy referendums
April 1924 events
Alexandros Papanastasiou